The United Nations Educational, Scientific and Cultural Organization (UNESCO) designates World Heritage Sites of outstanding universal value to cultural or natural heritage which have been nominated by countries which are signatories to the UNESCO World Heritage Convention, established in 1972. Cultural heritage consists of monuments (such as architectural works, monumental sculptures, or inscriptions), groups of buildings, and sites (including archaeological sites). Natural features (consisting of physical and biological formations), geological and physiographical formations (including habitats of threatened species of animals and plants), and natural sites which are important from the point of view of science, conservation or natural beauty, are defined as natural heritage. Myanmar, officially the Republic of the Union of Myanmar and also called Burma, ratified the convention on 29 April 1994.

, Myanmar has two sites on the list: Pyu Ancient Cities were listed in 2014 and Bagan in 2019. Both sites are cultural. In addition, Myanmar has 15 sites on its tentative list.



World Heritage Sites 
UNESCO lists sites under ten criteria; each entry must meet at least one of the criteria. Criteria i through vi are cultural, and vii through x are natural.

Tentative list
In addition to sites inscribed on the World Heritage List, member states can maintain a list of tentative sites that they may consider for nomination. Nominations for the World Heritage List are only accepted if the site was previously listed on the tentative list. , Myanmar lists 15 properties on its tentative list.

See also
 Tourism in Myanmar

References

Myanmar

Myanmar geography-related lists
World Heritage Sites